SXM may refer to:
 SXM (computational model), model for a Stream X-Machine
 SXM (transactional memory), a software under development at Microsoft Research
 SXM (socket), a physical computer interface used by Nvidia computational GPU modules
 SXM inc, a digital studio producing online entertainment for brands
 Sint Maarten's ISO 3166-1 alpha-3 code
 Princess Juliana International Airport's IATA code
 Sint Maarten national football team's FIFA code
 Sirius XM Radio's NYSE symbol
 Servicios Aéreos Especializados Mexicanos's ICAO code
 Starbury SXM, a basketball shoe produced by Starbury
 SxM, a 1994 album by Sangue Misto
 SxM, formats of scanning microscope image handled by Image SXM
 sxm, file extension for math files from StarOffice's StarMath (version 1–7)
 sxm, file extension for math files from OpenOffice.org XML (version 1)